Clermont Township is one of twenty townships in Fayette County, Iowa, USA.  As of the 2010 census, its population was 894.

Geography
According to the United States Census Bureau, Clermont Township covers an area of 36.34 square miles (94.11 square kilometers).

Cities, towns, villages
 Clermont

Adjacent townships
 Bloomfield Township, Winneshiek County (north)
 Post Township, Allamakee County (northeast)
 Grand Meadow Township, Clayton County (east)
 Marion Township, Clayton County (southeast)
 Pleasant Valley Township (south)
 Union Township (southwest)
 Dover Township (west)

Cemeteries
The township contains Saint Peters Cemetery.

Major highways
  U.S. Route 18

Airports and landing strips
 Dale Delight Airport

School districts
 Postville Community School District
 North Fayette Valley Community School District

Political districts
 Iowa's 1st congressional district
 State House District 18
 State Senate District 9

References
 United States Census Bureau 2008 TIGER/Line Shapefiles
 United States Board on Geographic Names (GNIS)
 United States National Atlas

External links
 US-Counties.com
 City-Data.com

Townships in Fayette County, Iowa
Townships in Iowa